The black-headed marmoset (Mico nigriceps) is a marmoset species endemic to Brazil. It inhabits humid tropical rainforest, mostly second growth and edge; the distribution is not exactly known but is thought to be Rio dos Marmelos in the north and east, Madeira River in the west and Ji-Paraná River in the south.

References

black-headed marmoset
Mammals of Brazil
Endemic fauna of Brazil
black-headed marmoset